Razzia Records is an independent record label based in Stockholm, Sweden. It is part of the Family Tree Music group along with Catchy Tunes and Family Tree Music, which are together distributed by Sony Music.

The label is run by Martina Ledinsky and Daniel Ledinsky. Their first release was Magic Villa by Tomas Rusiak in 2000. On 20 September 2011, it was also announced that Razzia Records would release Joakim Thåström's album, Beväpna dig med wingar, in early 2012.

Artists signed to Razzia Records
Adiam
Beatrice Eli
Blood Stain Child
David Sandström
Dundertåget
Firefox AK
Gerilja
Hello Saferide
I Are Droid
Joel Alme
Jonna Lee
Konie
Maia Hirasawa
Mange Schmidt
NiccoKick
Petra Marklund
Sakert!
Svenska Kyrkan/David Lindh
The Plan
They Live By Night
Thunder Express
Timo Räisänen
Tomas Rusiak

References

External links
Official site

Swedish record labels